The Hitman and Her was a British television dance music programme hosted by Pete Waterman and Michaela Strachan. The programme was produced for Granada Television and ran from September 1988 until December 1992 on ITV's Night Network.

The show toured various nightclubs, particularly in northern England, the English Midlands and Scotland, broadcasting the music and dancing at the club. The programme was often recorded on a Saturday night, edited on-the-fly, and shown a few hours later in the early hours of Sunday morning. In this era many television channels stopped showing programs altogether in the early hours of the morning, The Hitman and Her was one of the first UK shows to broadcast regularly late at night.

Background
The programme presented a taste of late-night clubbing, with long segments showing crowds dancing to popular hits, occasional celebrity performances, and party games, with Waterman and Strachan acting as masters of ceremony. The programme was sponsored by Eric Baskind's Ultimate Response Group.

The first show came from Mr Smiths in Warrington on 3 September 1988, and the final show aired on 5 December 1992 from The Discothèque Royale in Manchester and was often recorded at The Workmans Club Airdrie. The programme was often recorded on a Saturday night, edited on-the-fly, and shown a few hours later in the early hours of Sunday morning, the second half of the Saturday/Sunday version being repeated during the following night. The earlier shows were split into two halves: the first at 1am and the second at 4am, with the LWT's Night Network magazine show sandwiched in between. During 1988, The Hitman and Her was moved to 2am in some areas, while London still broadcast the show at 4am. The Hitman and Her remained at the 2am slot from April 1989 until its very last broadcast. A special edition of The Hitman and Her was broadcast as part of the ITV Telethon in 1992.

Clubbers would arrive at the featured club hoping to appear on television. Often members of the crowd would be plucked out to participate in games such as "Pass The Mic!", "Showing Out", and "Clothes Swap". It was produced for Granada Television at first by Music Box Productions, then by Granada TV itself, and later by Clear Idea Productions through to the final edition.

In I Love 1988, Pete Waterman said that the idea for The Hitman and Her came to him when he turned on the TV late one night and the only TV station still on-air was featuring guest Elvis Costello talking about Irish politics.

Music
The theme tune, "Cocoon", was performed by Timerider, a pseudonym of the German singer Fancy. The track also appeared in the film The Fruit Machine, and Waterman also used it as the signature tune for his Saturday morning Radio City show. It is still today used as the theme tune for Barnsley F.C. and is played as the team comes out onto the pitch at every home game. Latterly, the show's theme tune changed to "Rofo's theme" by Rofo.

The show acted as both an outlet to showcase artists from the PWL stable – such as Kylie Minogue, 2 Unlimited, Anticapella, and Opus III, as well as featuring the key club tunes from the day – largely as a result of Waterman's interest in the fledgling acid house scene. Speaking to The Guardian in November 2013, Waterman explained "I loved acid house and trance. I just absolutely adored it." One track the show championed in particular was "Stakker Humanoid" by Brian Dougans, which Waterman described as "a Hitman and Her tune".

In April 1992, The Hitman and Her hosted a special show at the rave night Energy from The Eclipse, Coventry,
Waterman’s home city. Strachan would memorably comment that "It's too hot ... they've all got eyes like saucers...".

Stage dancers 

Clive Donaldson was the resident dancer. Jason Orange was invited to join Take That after appearing as a regular dancer, Ian Connal went on to appear in a number of 90's music videos and former dancers Jimmy Constable and Spike Dawbarn would go on to be members of the boy band 911. Neil Rutherford (Damson) went onto further work on TV and stage.

References

External links
 

Television series by ITV Studios
Dance television shows
1988 British television series debuts
1980s British music television series
1990s British music television series
1992 British television series endings
English-language television shows
Television shows produced by Granada Television